Ayrat Zakiev is a Russian Paralympic powerlifter. He represented Russia at the 2008 Summer Paralympics and at the 2012 Summer Paralympics and he won the silver medal in the men's 60 kg event in 2008.

At the 2013 IPC Open European Powerlifting Championships he won the gold medal in the men's 65 kg event.

At the 2014 World Championships held in Dubai, United Arab Emirates, he won the silver medal in the men's 65 kg event.

References

External links 
 

Living people
Year of birth missing (living people)
Place of birth missing (living people)
Russian powerlifters
Powerlifters at the 2008 Summer Paralympics
Powerlifters at the 2012 Summer Paralympics
Medalists at the 2008 Summer Paralympics
Paralympic silver medalists for Russia
Paralympic medalists in powerlifting
Paralympic powerlifters of Russia
21st-century Russian people